Aleš Kohout (born 3 January 1972) is a Czech former footballer who played as a forward.

Career
He played in the Gambrinus liga for FK Jablonec, scoring twice in 15 appearances. He scored the decisive goal in the final of the 1997–98 Czech Cup as Jablonec beat Drnovice. Kohout played in the second division for Mladá Boleslav in the 1998–99 season. He subsequently played in the lower divisions in Germany.

References 

1972 births
Living people
Czech footballers
Czech First League players
FK Jablonec players
FK Mladá Boleslav players
Wuppertaler SV players
SSVg Velbert players
KFC Uerdingen 05 players
Czech expatriate footballers
Expatriate footballers in Germany
Czech expatriate sportspeople in Germany
Association football forwards